The 2007–08 season was the 99th year of competitive football played by Hartlepool United Football Club, a professional association football club based in Hartlepool, County Durham, England. Along with competing in League One, the club also participated in the FA Cup, League Cup and League Trophy. The season covers the period from 1 July 2007 to 30 June 2008.

Season summary 
Having finished second in League Two the previous season, manager Danny Wilson led the club to a 15th-place finish in their first season back in League One, although they were only six points clear of the relegation zone in a tight division.

Players

Current squad

Transfers

Transfers in

Loans in

Transfers out

Loans out

Competitions

Results

Pre-season friendlies

League One

Results summary

League table

Results by matchday

Results

FA Cup

League Cup

Football League Trophy

Squad statistics

Appearances and goals

|}

Goalscorers

Clean Sheets

Penalties

Suspensions

References 

Hartlepool United
Hartlepool United F.C. seasons
2000s in County Durham